This is a list of United States Air Force operations squadrons.  It serves as a break out of the comprehensive List of United States Air Force squadrons.

See also
 List of United States Air Force squadrons

References

External links

Operations